Chinnapong Raksri (born 14 April 1995) is a Thai professional footballer who plays as a goalkeeper for Thai League 2 club Muangkan United.

External links

Living people
1995 births
Chinnapong Raksri
Chinnapong Raksri
Association football goalkeepers
Chinnapong Raksri
Chinnapong Raksri